The Garden Spider is a 1952 Italian short documentary film directed by Alberto Ancilotto. It was nominated for an Academy Award for Best Documentary Short.

References

External links

1952 films
1950s Italian-language films
1950s short documentary films
Italian black-and-white films
Italian short documentary films
1952 documentary films
1952 short films
1950s English-language films
1950s Italian films